Charlotte of France (23 October 1516 – 18 September 1524) was the second child and second daughter of King Francis I and his wife Claude.

Early life

Charlotte was born in the Château d'Amboise, on 23 October 1516, the second daughter and child of King Francis I and Queen Claude. She had greenish blue eyes and bright red hair. She was one of the six children of the King and Queen that had red hair, a trait inherited from Anne of Brittany, Claude's mother. She lived a happy life, moving from the Château d'Amboise to the Château de Saint-Germain-en-Laye before March 1519.

Following the death of her older sister Louise in 1518, Charlotte took her place as the fiancée of King Charles I of Spain under the Treaty of Noyon. The marriage would never come to fruition.

Later life and death
The Princess spent all of her remaining days at the Château de Saint-Germain-en-Laye. She had always been a delicate, frail child. At age seven, she contracted measles, the same disease which had killed her uncle, Charles Orlando, Dauphin of France, thirty years earlier. The only person who looked after her while she was sick was her aunt, Margaret of Angoulême, as her mother had already died two months earlier, her grandmother Louise of Savoy was very sick, and her father had gone to war. He was later imprisoned, so was nowhere near his daughter at the time of her death. It appears as if Charlotte was very close to her aunt, who was heartbroken and distraught when her "little one" died, on 18 September 1524.

Ancestry

References

 Freer, Martha Walker. The Life of Marguerite D'Angoulême, Queen of Navarre. pp. 141–143. Second Edition, Revised. London, 1856.
 The Cambridge Modern History. A. W. Ward, editor. Vol. 2, p. 417. MacMillan Company, 1904.
 Portrait of Charlotte of France. Minneapolis Institute of Arts.

1516 births
1524 deaths
Burials at the Basilica of Saint-Denis
French princesses
Charlotte
Infectious disease deaths in France
Deaths from measles
People from Amboise
French people of Italian descent
French people of Breton descent
Royalty and nobility who died as children
Daughters of kings